Bucaná is one of the 31 barrios of the municipality of Ponce, Puerto Rico.  Together with Canas, Playa, Vayas, and Capitanejo, Bucaná is one of the municipality's five coastal barrios. The name of this barrio is of native Indian origin. It was founded in 1831.

History
Prior to being established as a barrio of Ponce, around 1597, the bay of Ponce had a small place populated by Christian European settlers that was called Bucaná. In 1800, Bucaná was known as Coto Bucaná, a type of grant of land suitable for farming to a resident by the Spanish king in recognition for some service provided by the resident to the King.

Location
Bucaná is an urban barrio located in the southern section of the municipality, within the Ponce city limits, and southeast of the traditional center of the city, Plaza Las Delicias. The toponymy, or origin of the name, alludes to the river that makes its way through it, Río Bucaná.

Boundaries

It is bounded on the North by Marginal Street/PR-578 (one block north of PR-1), on the South by the Caribbean Sea, on the West by Rio Bucana, PR-2 (roughly), Rio Portugues, and the Portugues-Bucana Rivers Channel, and on the East by Bucara Street/Los Caobos Avenue, PR-52 (roughly), and the Costa Caribe Country Club East Access Road.

In terms of barrio-to-barrio boundaries, Bucaná is bounded in the North by Sabanetas, in the South by the Caribbean Sea, in the West by San Anton and Playa, and in the East by Vayas.

Demographics
In 2000, the population of Bucaná was 3,963 persons, with a density of 2,958 persons per square mile. In 2010, the population of Bucaná was 3,630 persons, with a density of 2,669.10 persons per square mile. It has the shortest coastline of all five of Ponce's coastal barrios.

The communities of Los Caobos and Camino del Sur are found in Bucana.

Major roads in barrio Bucana are PR-1, PR-578 and PR-52.

Landmarks
Barrio Bucaná is home to the Julio Enrique Monagas Family Park.

See also

 List of communities in Puerto Rico

References

External links

 Management Plan for La Esperanza Nature Preserve in Ponce, Puerto Rico. Matthew Bourque, Drew Digeser, Stephen Partridge, Hussein Yatim. Worcester Polytechnic Institute. Worcester, Massachusttes. 2 May 2012. Retrieved 4 August 2013.

Barrio Bucaná
Populated coastal places in Puerto Rico
1831 establishments in Puerto Rico